The following is a list of some notable Old Oundelians, alumni of Oundle School in Northamptonshire, England:

Armed forces
Air Vice Marshal David Atcherley, senior Royal Air Force officer
Major-General Llewellyn William Atcherley, British army officer and Chief Constable of West Yorkshire Constabulary
Air Marshal Sir Richard Atcherley, senior Royal Air Force officer. He served as Commander-in-Chief of the Royal Pakistan Air Force between 1949 and 1951
Bernard Paul Gascoigne Beanlands, Canadian World War I flying ace credited with eight aerial victories
Patrick Beesly, wartime intelligence officer and author
James Bradley MBE, prisoner-of-war of the Japanese during World War II
Rear Admiral Benjamin Bryant CB DSO** DSC, the most successful British submarine ace to survive the war
Count Manfred Beckett Czernin, World War II Royal Air Force Pilot and later in the war an operative with the Special Operations Executive
Denis Eadie MC, British Army officer who was awarded the Military Cross by Field Marshal Lord Wavell for his conduct during the relief of Kohima
Wing Commander Patrick Gibbs, RAF pilot and journalist
Alan Jerrard VC, recipient of the Victoria Cross for action during the Great War
Norman Jewell, World War II Royal Navy officer
Cecil Leonard Knox VC, recipient of the Victoria Cross for action during the Great War
John Langdon, Royal Marine officer at D-Day, later became an Anglican priest
William Howard Livens, soldier and inventor
Sir Rhys Llewellyn, 2nd Baronet, soldier and mining executive
General Sir Richard Shireff, KCB, CBE, British army officer and former Deputy Supreme Allied Commander Europe
Air Marshal Sir Charles Steele, former Commander-in-Chief of RAF Coastal Command
Sir (Charles) Geoffrey Vickers VC, lawyer, administrator, writer and pioneering systems scientist
Vice Admiral Sir John Michael Villiers, Royal Navy officer and Fourth Sea Lord
General Sir Charles John Waters, former Commander-in-Chief, Land Forces
Harold Whistler, fighter pilot and flying ace
Air Commodore John Whitworth, Royal Air Force pilot in the 1930s and a commander during and after the Second World War
Sir Charles Rodger Winn, Royal Navy intelligence officer and judge
Major General Sir John Winterton, Governor and Commander of Trieste
Captain William Wright, WW1 flying ace and civil servant
Michael Wynn, 7th Baron Newborough, Royal Navy officer

Arts
Christopher Alexander, architect, academic and author
Al Alvarez, poet
John Davys Beresford, author
Peter Bicknell, architect and art historian
George Blagden, actor, singer
Michael Broadbent MW, wine critic and auctioneer
Lucy Brown, actress
Thomas Carr, artist
Allan Chappelow, writer and photographer
Joanna Christie, actress 
Jim Clark, Academy Award-winning film editor
Charles Crichton, film director
Bruce Dickinson, lead singer in the band Iron Maiden, commercial pilot, fencer
John Dreyfus, book designer and historian of printing
David Edgar, playwright
John Maxwell Edmonds, poet, dramatist and writer of celebrated epitaphs
Adrian Fisher MBE, maze designer
Colin Franklin writer, bibliographer, book-collector and antiquarian bookseller
Roderick Gordon, author
Anthony Holden, biographer
Maxwell Hutchinson, architect, broadcaster and former President of the Royal Institute of British Architects (RIBA)
Fred Inglis, professor of Cultural Studies
Christopher Joll, historian and author
Jon Jones, BAFTA winning film and television director
Frederick Knott, playwright
David Pickering, writer
George Sassoon, writer
Sir Peter Saunders, theatrical impresario
Sir Peter Scott, conservationist and painter
Paul Seabright, academic and writer
Keith Shackleton, conservationist and painter
Judge Smith, musician, Van der Graaf Generator
Robert Speechly, architect
John Charles Traylen, architect
Kenneth Hotham Vickers, historian
Bill Ward, actor
Ivo Watts-Russell, music producer, president 4AD Records
Sir Bertram Clough Williams-Ellis, architect, designer of Portmeirion
Martin Woodhouse, author and scriptwriter

Business and Finance
John Allwood, businessman
Alex Baldock, businessman, banker, CEO of Dixons Carphone
Sir Alan Budd, economist
Geoffrey Crowther, Baron Crowther, businessman, economist and journalist
David Fleming, economist and environmental writer
Sir Roland Franklin, Antigua and Barbuda-based merchant banker
Jason Gissing, entrepreneur, co-founder of Ocado Group
Colin Matthews, businessman and Chairman of Highways England
Sir David Newbigging, businessman and Hong Kong politician
Nazir Razak, banker
Sir Howard Stringer, chairman and CEO Sony Corporation
Sir John Timpson, founder of British retailer Timpson
John Ward, economist and trade union leader
James Kenneth Weir, peer and businessman

Engineering
Tony Blackman, aviator and test pilot for Avro
Major Patrick Hunter Gordon, soldier and electrical engineer
Sir Richard O'Brien, engineer and industrial relations expert
Raymond Mays, racing driver, engineer and entrepreneur, co-founder of ERA and BRM
Kenyon Taylor, electrical engineer and inventor
Amherst Villiers, engineer (automotive, aeronautical, astronautical), portrait painter
Rex Wailes, engineer and historian

Media
Barrie Edgar, TV producer
Damian Grammaticas, BBC Europe Correspondent
Cecil Lewis, co-founder of the BBC, fighter pilot and author of 'Sagittarius Rising'
David Loyn, International Development Correspondent of BBC News
Arthur Marshall, writer and broadcaster
Rufus Pollock, economist and founder of Open Knowledge International
Norman Smith, Assistant Political Editor of BBC News
Charles Wintour, newspaper editor

Politics, Civil Service and the Law
Baron Allan of Hallam, Liberal Democrat M.P.
Major Basil Barton, solicitor and M.P.
Michael Beaumont, Conservative M.P.
Sir Roy Beldam, Lord Justice of Appeal
Caroline Criado Perez, feminist campaigner and writer 
Robert Dixon-Smith, Baron Dixon-Smith, Conservative M.P.
Frederick Erroll, 1st Baron Erroll of Hale, Conservative M.P.
Ailwyn Fellowes, 3rd Baron de Ramsey, peer and Lord Lieutenant of Huntingdonshire
Charles Finch-Knightley, 11th Earl of Aylesford, peer styled "Lord Guernsey", Justice of the Peace and Deputy Lieutenant for Warwickshire
Gary Flather, judge and disability campaigner
Abraham Flint, barrister and judge
Donald Gorrie, Scottish Liberal Democrat M.P. and former M.S.P. for Central Scotland
John Grimston, 6th Earl of Verulam, peer and M.P.
John Hanscomb, politician
Denis Keegan, barrister and M.P.
David Kitchin, Lord Kitchin, UK Supreme Court Justice
Owen Lloyd George, 3rd Earl Lloyd-George of Dwyfor, peer
Sir William Laxton 
Sir William Montagu, judge
Michael Mustill, Baron Mustill, Law Lord
Mark Ormerod, civil servant and chief executive of The Supreme Court of the United Kingdom
Sir Herbert Palmer, Governor of Gambia and Cyprus
Ralph Bonner Pink, Conservative M.P.
Christian Herbert, 6th Earl of Powis
James Provan, farmer, businessman and M.E.P.
David Reddaway, diplomat
David Lockhart-Mure Renton, Baron Renton, Conservative M.P.
Sir David Richards, UK Supreme Court Justice
John Vernon Rob, diplomat and first High Commissioner to Singapore
The Rt. Hon. Kenneth Robinson, Labour M.P. and Minister of Health 1964-1968
Sir Colin Shepherd, Conservative M.P.
Sir Joseph Simpson, Metropolitan Police commissioner
Michael Tatham, diplomat
Peter Thurnham, Conservative and Liberal Democrat M.P.
Prince Tomislav of Yugoslavia
Sir George Mark Waller, judge and former Lord Justice of Appeal
Arthur Wynn, civil servant and recruiter of Soviet spies, known as "Agent Scott"

Science, Medicine and Religion
Michael Ashby, neurologist, witness in John Bodkin Adams case
David Barker, epidemiologist
Colin Bibby PhD, ornithologist and conservationist
Sir Cyril Clarke, physician
Richard Dawkins, ethologist, evolutionary biologist and science writer
George Dawson Preston, physicist and crystallographer
William Dillingham, clergyman and academic
Charles Fagge, surgeon
Hartley T. Ferrar, geologist who accompanied Captain Scott's First Antarctic Expedition
Alister Hardy, marine biologist
John B. Harman, former chairman of the British National Formulary
Leslie Hilton Brown OBE, ornithologist and agriculturalist
Hugh Jackson, paediatrician
Richard Keynes, physiologist
Stephen John Keynes, chairman of the Charles Darwin Trust
Thomas Layng, clergyman and soldier
Alan Lindsay Mackay, crystallographer
Bobby Milburn, priest
Clive Minton, ornithologist
David Nabarro, senior UN system coordinator
C. H. Nash, clergyman and founder of the Melbourne Bible Institute
Joseph Needham, biochemist
Guy Newton, biochemist and rower
Robin Nicholson, metallurgist, Chief Scientific Advisor to cabinet
David Oates, archaeologist and Ancient Near East specialist
P. D. Orton, mycologist
Derek Richter, neuroscientist
John Speechly, bishop
Simon Tavaré, founding director of the Herbert and Florence Irving Institute of Cancer Dynamics
Ronald F. Tylecote, archaeologist and metallurgist

Sport
Matthew Austin, cricketer
Richard Beesly, Olympic gold medal, 1928 Coxless fours rowing
Rollo Brandt, bobsledder, competed for Great Britain at 1956 Winter Olympics
Farn Carpmael, rower
Carston Catcheside, former England rugby player
Alexander Crawford, cricketer
Ben Curry, rugby player
Tom Curry, England rugby player
Bill Elsey, racehorse trainer
Patrick Foster, cricketer
Christopher Gimson, cricketer and civil servant
Eric Gore-Browne, cricketer
Tom Harrison, fmr. cricketer and current CEO of the England and Wales Cricket Board (ECB)
Iain Henderson, cricketer
Reggie Ingle, cricketer
Will Jefferson, professional cricketer
David Jennens, Olympic rower
Sir Harry Morton Llewellyn, 3rd Baronet of Bwllfa, showjumper
Robert Martin, cricketer
Michael Maw, cricketer
John Michael Mills, cricketer
Peter Morley, president Crystal Palace Football Club
Sam Olver, rugby player
Richard Pearsall, cricketer
Mark Phythian, cricketer
Alfred Graham Skinner, cricketer
Greg Smith, cricketer
John Willoughby Dixie Smith, cricketer
Tom Stallard, Olympic rower
Arthur Sutthery, cricketer
Tim Swinson, rugby player
Cameron Wake, cricketer
Dave Walder, professional rugby player
Legh Winser, cricketer and golfer
Arthur Woodhouse, cricketer
James Wykes, cricketer and schoolmaster
Norman Wykes

References

 
Oundle
Old Oundelians